The Pisces–Cetus Supercluster Complex is a galaxy filament.  It includes the Laniakea Supercluster which contains the Virgo Supercluster lobe which in turn contains the Local Group, the galaxy cluster that includes the Milky Way.
This filament is adjacent to the Perseus–Pegasus Filament.

Discovery
Astronomer R. Brent Tully of the University of Hawaii’s Institute of Astronomy identified the Complex in 1987.

Extent
The Pisces–Cetus Supercluster Complex is estimated to be about 1.0 billion light-years (Gly) long and 150 million light years (Mly) wide.  It is one of the largest structures known in the observable universe, but is exceeded by the Sloan Great Wall (1.3 Gly), Clowes–Campusano LQG (2.0 Gly), U1.11 LQG (2.5 Gly), Huge-LQG (4.0 Gly), and Hercules–Corona Borealis Great Wall (10 Gly), respectively.

The complex comprises about 60 clusters and is estimated to have a total mass of 10 . According to the discoverer, the complex is composed of 5 parts:
 The Pisces–Cetus Supercluster
 The Perseus–Pegasus chain, including the Perseus–Pisces Supercluster
 The Pegasus–Pisces chain
 The Sculptor region, including the Sculptor Supercluster and Hercules Supercluster
 The Laniakea Supercluster, which contains our Virgo Supercluster (Local Supercluster) as well as the Hydra–Centaurus Supercluster.

With its mass of 10 , our Virgo Supercluster accounts only for 0.1 percent of the total mass of the complex.

The complex was named after the Pisces–Cetus Superclusters, which are its richest superclusters.

Image

See also

 Entropy
 Fossil galaxy group
 Galaxy group
 Galaxy cluster
 Galactic orientation
 Intracluster medium
 Large-scale structure of the universe
 List of galaxy groups and clusters
 Supercluster
 Timeline of galaxies and large scale structures

References

External links

 
Astronomical objects discovered in 1987
Galaxy filaments